Mohan Lal Brakta is the current MLA for the Rohru constituency in the Himachal Pradesh Legislative Assembly and Chief Parliamentary Secretary and a prominent Koli leader by caste. He was elected at the December 2022 Legislative Assembly election.

Mohan Lal Bakta is the MLA since 2012. He has a degree in LL.B..

Personal life 
Mohan Lal Brakta was born to Shri Teju Ram Koli on 19 June 1965 at Rohru, Distt. Shimla and married to Smt. Ranjna Brakta. Brakta have one son and one daughter.

Political career 
Mohan Lal Brakta was elected to the Himachal Pradesh State Legislative Assembly in 2012 and remained Member of Estimates, Rural Planning, Public Undertakings, Welfare, Privileges and Ethics Committees from 2013 to 2017.

Brakta Re-elected to the thirteenth Vidhan Sabha (2nd term) and nominated as Member of Welfare, Rule and e-Governance-cum-General Purposes Committees.

He re-elected to 14th Legislative Assembly in December, 2022.

Reference 

Himachal Pradesh MLAs 2012–2017
Himachal Pradesh MLAs 2017–2022
Himachal Pradesh MLAs 2022–2027
Himachal Pradesh University alumni
1965 births
Living people